A list of notable politicians of the German Free Democratic Party:

A
Ernst Achenbach
Jens Ackermann
Karl Addicks
Grigorios Aggelidis
Christian Ahrendt
Gustav Altenhain
Alexander Alvaro
Hermann Andersen
Joachim Angermeyer
Karl Atzenroth
Christel Augenstein
Rudolf Augstein

B
Thomas Bach
Daniel Bahr
Martin Bangemann
Georg Barfuß
Uwe Barth
Gerhart Baum
Nicola Beer
Werner Best
Stefan Birkner
Karl Theodor Bleek
Franz Blücher
Jörg Bode
Wigald Boning
William Borm
Sigismund von Braun
Rainer Brüderle
Angelika Brunkhorst
Ignatz Bubis
Ewald Bucher
Ernst Burgbacher

C
Jorgo Chatzimarkakis
Jürgen Chrobog
Jürgen Creutzmann

D
Rolf Dahlgrün
Ralf Dahrendorf
Thomas Dehler
Christian Dürr

E
Hans A. Engelhard
Adolf Ernst
Josef Ertl
Jörg van Essen

F
Jan-Christoph Oetjen
Erwin Fischer
Karl-Hermann Flach
Björn Försterling
Helmar Frank
Rolf Frick
Hans Friderichs

G
Karl Geldner
Hans-Dietrich Genscher
Wolfgang Gerhardt
Manfred Gerlach
Christian Grascha
Martin Grüner

H
Jörg-Uwe Hahn
Dieter Hallervorden
Hildegard Hamm-Brücher
Richard Hammer
Christoph Hartmann
Johann Hauser
Helmut Haussmann
Wolfgang Heinz
Hans Henn
Theodor Heuss
Elly Heuss-Knapp
Burkhard Hirsch
Nadja Hirsch
Elke Hoff
Karl Holl
Hermann Höpker-Aschoff
Werner Hoyer
Karl Hübner

I
Fritz Emil Irrgang

J
Harry John

K
Michael Kauch
Friedrich-Wilhelm Kiel
Wolf Klinz
Werner Klumpp
Waldemar Koch
Silvana Koch-Mehrin
Gabriela König
Georg Kohl
Heinrich Kohl
Holger Krahmer
Ottomar Rodolphe Vlad Dracula Prince Kretzulesco
Wolfgang Kubicki

L
Alexander Graf Lambsdorff
Heinz Lange
Hubert Lanz
Sibylle Laurischk
Sabine Leutheusser-Schnarrenberger
Christian Lindner
Hubertus Prinz zu Löwenstein-Wertheim-Freudenberg
Marie Elisabeth Lüders

M
Reinhold Maier
Werner Maihofer
Hasso von Manteuffel
Helmut Markwort
Gesine Meißner
Erich Mende
Friedrich Middelhauve
Erich Mix
Jürgen Möllemann
Sky du Mont
Hans Mühlenfeld

N
Fritz Neumayer
Dirk Niebel

O
Theodor Oberländer
Rudolf Opitz
Rainer Ortleb

P
Andreas Paulus
 Rose Pauly
Cornelia Pieper
Andreas Pinkwart

R
Wilhelm Rath
Günter Rexrodt
Klaus Rickert
Klaus Rainer Röhl
Hans Joachim von Rohr-Demmin
Uwe Ronneburger
Philipp Rösler

S
Hans-Heinrich Sander
Walter Scheel
Eugen Schiffer
Konrad Schily
Wilhelmine Schirmer-Pröscher
Edzard Schmidt-Jortzig
Jürgen Schmieder
Peter Schmitz
Fritz Schneider
Klaus Scholder
Walter Schroeder
Fritz-Rudolf Schultz
Marina Schuster
Willem Schuth
Hans-Werner Schwarz
Gerhard Graf von Schwerin
Hartmut Sieckmann
Hermann Otto Solms
Max Stadler
Alexander von Stahl
Wolfgang Stammberger
Heinz Starke

T
Alexandra Thein

V
Günter Verheugen
Fritz Vogt

W
 Fritz Walter
Rüdiger von Wechmar
Liesel Westermann
Guido Westerwelle
Eberhard Wildermuth
Heike Wilms-Kegel
Carl Wirths

Z
Holger Zastrow
Martin Zeil
Roland Zielke

 
Free Democratic Party